Igor Moiseevich Krichever (8 October 1950 – 1 December 2022) was a Russian academic and mathematician.

Biography
Krichever was born in Kuybyshev to aviation engineer Moisey Solomonovich Krichever and Maria Leyzerovna Arlievskaya. He received a silver medal at the 1967 International Mathematical Olympiad. He graduated from the MSU Faculty of Mechanics and Mathematics in 1972.

In 1990, he became a senior researcher for the Landau Institute for Theoretical Physics. From 1992 to 1996, he was a professor at the Independent University of Moscow. In 1997, he became a professor at Columbia University in New York City, where he served as dean of the mathematics department from 2008 to 2011. In 2013, he became a professor at the Higher School of Economics in Moscow.

In 2011, Krichever was awarded the Medal of the Order "For Merit to the Fatherland" II class.

Igor Krichever died in New York City on 1 December 2022, at the age of 72.

References

1950 births
2022 deaths
Soviet mathematicians
Russian mathematicians
American mathematicians
Recipients of the Medal of the Order "For Merit to the Fatherland" II class
Academic staff of the Higher School of Economics
Academic staff of the Independent University of Moscow
Columbia University faculty
Scientists from Samara, Russia